Damiere Byrd (born January 27, 1993) is an American football wide receiver  for the Atlanta Falcons of the National Football League (NFL). He played college football at South Carolina and was signed as an undrafted free agent by the Carolina Panthers in 2015. Byrd has also been a member of the Arizona Cardinals, New England Patriots, and Chicago Bears.

College career
Byrd played wide receiver for the South Carolina Gamecocks football team as a true freshman in 2011.  After his senior season in 2014, Byrd had amassed 1265 yards on 68 receptions (18.6 yards/catch) with 10 touchdowns.

Byrd was considered the fastest player on the team while at South Carolina and also competed for the South Carolina track team.

Professional career

On the South Carolina Pro Day, Byrd only ran the 40-yard dash once, since his left calf muscle tightened up on him. Byrd, having a track & field background, was able to put up impressive numbers, completing the short shuttle in 4.03 seconds, the three-cone in 6.6 seconds and the 60-yard long shuttle in 10.90 seconds, faster than any other time posted at the 2015 scouting combine.

Carolina Panthers
On May 8, 2015, Byrd was signed as an undrafted free agent by the Carolina Panthers. On September 5, 2015, he was released by the Panthers. On September 7, 2015, Byrd was signed to the Panthers' practice squad, where he spent the rest of his rookie season. On February 7, 2016, Byrd's Panthers played in Super Bowl 50. In the game, the Panthers fell to the Denver Broncos by a score of 24–10.

2016
Byrd signed a reserve/futures contract with the Panthers on February 9, 2016.

Byrd made the initial 53-man roster in 2016 but was inactive for the first five games before being released on October 14, 2016. He was re-signed to the practice squad the next day. He was promoted back to the active roster on December 29, 2016.

2017
On October 1, 2017 during the second quarter of a game versus the New England Patriots, Byrd broke his left arm on a reverse play. He was subsequently placed on the injured reserve two days later. He was activated off injured reserve to the active roster on December 2, 2017. In Week 16, Byrd returned a kickoff 103 yards, a franchise record, and scored the Panthers' first kickoff-return touchdown since 2011 which was crucial in the 22–19 win over the Buccaneers, earning him NFC Special Teams Player of the Week. However during the second half of the game, Byrd suffered a lower leg injury and subsequently was placed on injured reserve on December 26, 2017.

2018
Byrd entered the 2018 season as the Panthers primary punt returner. He played in eight games before suffering a broken arm in Week 12. He was placed on injured reserve on November 27, 2018.

Arizona Cardinals
On March 26, 2019, Byrd signed with the Arizona Cardinals. He played in 11 games with three starts, recording a career-high 32 catches for 359 yards and one touchdown.

New England Patriots
On March 23, 2020, Byrd signed a one-year contract with the New England Patriots.

In Week 11 against the Houston Texans, Byrd recorded six catches for 132 yards and a touchdown during the 27–20 loss.

Byrd finished the season playing in 16 games with 47 receptions, 604 receiving yards, 1 receiving touchdown, and 2 rushing attempts for 15 yards.

Chicago Bears 
On May 4, 2021, Byrd signed with the Chicago Bears. In the Week 14 game against the Green Bay Packers, Byrd caught a 54 yard touchdown pass from Justin Fields.

Atlanta Falcons
On April 1, 2022, Byrd signed a one-year contract with the Atlanta Falcons.

References

External links
New England Patriots bio
Carolina Panthers bio
South Carolina Gamecocks bio

1993 births
Living people
Players of American football from New Jersey
American football wide receivers
African-American players of American football
People from Gloucester Township, New Jersey
Sportspeople from Camden County, New Jersey
South Carolina Gamecocks football players
South Carolina Gamecocks men's track and field athletes
Carolina Panthers players
Arizona Cardinals players
Atlanta Falcons players
New England Patriots players
Chicago Bears players
21st-century African-American sportspeople